Events from the year 1742 in France.

Incumbents 
Monarch: Louis XV

Events
 24 May – War of the Austrian Succession: Battle of Sahay

Births

Deaths
 20 November – Melchior de Polignac, French diplomat (b. 1661)

See also

References

1740s in France